Dave Dickerson Jr. (born March 29, 1967) is an American college basketball coach, currently the head coach at USC Upstate. He previously served as the associate head coach at Ohio State, and was the head men's basketball coach at Tulane.

Head coaching record

References

External links
 USC Upstate profile

1967 births
Living people
American men's basketball players
Basketball coaches from South Carolina
Basketball players from South Carolina
College men's basketball head coaches in the United States
Gardner–Webb Runnin' Bulldogs men's basketball coaches
James Madison Dukes men's basketball coaches
Maryland Terrapins men's basketball coaches
Maryland Terrapins men's basketball players
Ohio State Buckeyes men's basketball coaches
People from Bamberg County, South Carolina
Radford Highlanders men's basketball coaches
Tulane Green Wave men's basketball coaches
USC Upstate Spartans men's basketball coaches
Utah Jazz scouts